Bibiheybət (also, Bibiheybat, Bibiheibat, Bibi-Heybat, Bibi-Heibat; formerly known as Khanlar, Euwbet, Helenendorf and Shikhovo) is a municipality in Baku, Azerbaijan. It has a population of 1,451.

In 2007, in connection with the expansion of the Bibiheybat Motorway and the reconstruction of the similarly named mosque, dozens of families were relocated to new and modern homes. In addition, a stadium,  a kindergarten and other constructions were rebuilt. Around the newly reconstructed stadium, a recreation park was laid out to provide the local community with mass cultural recreation.

In 1846, the Russians drilled the first exploratory oil well in the world here, to a depth of 21 m.  In the 1890s, a large oil field was discovered offshore, which led to land reclamation in 1924, in order to produce the field. Pavel Pototsky was one of the prime founders of the oil bay around Bibiheybat.

Places of interest 

 Bibi-Heybat Mosque

See also 
 Petroleum industry in Azerbaijan

References

External links 

Populated places in Baku